Tropiocolotes hormozganensis is a species of gecko of the genus Tropiocolotes. It is found in the Hormozgan Province, Iran. The specific epithet hormozganensis  relates to the type locality, the Hormozgan Province.

References

hormozganensis
Reptiles described in 2018
Reptiles of Iran
Endemic fauna of Iran